In enzymology, a manganese-transporting ATPase is an enzyme that catalyzes the chemical reaction

ATP + H2O + Mn2+out  ADP + phosphate + Mn2+in

The 3 substrates of this enzyme are ATP, H2O, and Mn2+, whereas its 3 products are ADP, phosphate, and Mn2+.

This enzyme belongs to the family of hydrolases, specifically those acting on acid anhydrides to catalyse transmembrane movement of substances. The systematic name of this enzyme class is called ATP phosphohydrolase (manganese-importing). This enzyme is also known as ABC-type manganese permease complex.

References

 
 
 
 

EC 3.6.3
Enzymes of unknown structure